Eddie Wilkins is a former professional rugby league footballer who played in the 1960s. He played at club level for the Featherstone Rovers (Heritage № 453).

Club career
Eddie Wilkins made his début for the Featherstone Rovers on Saturday 28 August 1965.

References

External links
Search for "Wilkins" at rugbyleagueproject.org

Featherstone Rovers players
Place of birth missing
English rugby league players
Year of birth missing